"The Flying Trunk" (Danish: Den flyvende Kuffert) is a literary fairy tale by the Danish poet and author Hans Christian Andersen about a young man who has a flying trunk that carries him to Turkey where he visits the Sultan's daughter. The tale was first published 1839.

Plot summary 
A young man squanders his inheritance until he has nothing left but a few shillings, a pair of slippers, and an old dressing-gown. A friend sends him a trunk with directions to pack up and be off. Having nothing to pack, he gets into the trunk himself. The trunk is enchanted and carries him to the land of the Turks. He uses the trunk to visit the sultan's daughter, who is kept in a tower because of a prophecy that her marriage would be unhappy.

Analysis

English poet Julia Pardoe, on her introduction to The Thousand and One Days, a compilation of Middle Eastern folktales, remarked that its tale The Story of the Princess Schirine was "the groundwork" of Andersen's tale.

Adaptations 
In 2014, a musical theatre adaptation of "The Flying Trunk" by Bobby Sample (book, lyrics, and music), with music by Josh Hontz, Katie Sample, and Connor Sample, debuted at Spotlight Youth Theatre of Glendale, Arizona. This adaptation won the 2014 National Youth Arts Award for Outstanding New Musical.

See also

List of works by Hans Christian Andersen
Vilhelm Pedersen, first illustrator of Andersen's fairy tales

References

External links 

"The Flying Trunk" Jean Hersholt's English translation
Den flyvende Kuffert  Original Danish text
Original manuscript Odense City Museum

1839 short stories
Short stories by Hans Christian Andersen
Danish fairy tales
Fictional objects